The Manchester Man is a 1920 British silent drama film directed by Bert Wynne and starring Hayford Hobbs, Aileen Bagot and Joan Hestor. It was an adaptation of the 1876 novel The Manchester Man by Isabella Banks. It follows the lifetime of a Manchester resident Jabez Clegg during the turbulent 19th century.

The plot has been summarized by Denis Gifford as "Lancashire, 1800. Clerk loves merchant's daughter who elopes with crook."

Cast
 Hayford Hobbs - Jabez Clegg
 Aileen Bagot - Augusta Ashton
 Joan Hestor - Bess Clegg
 Warwick Ward - Captain Aspinall
 A. Harding Steerman - Mr Ashton
 Dora De Winton - Mrs Ashton
 Hubert Willis - Simon Clegg
 William Burchill - Reverend Jotty Brooks
 Charles Pelly - Kit
 Cecil Calvert - Man of Affairs

References

External links

1920 films
Films directed by Bert Wynne
1920 drama films
British drama films
Ideal Film Company films
Films based on British novels
Films set in England
Films set in Manchester
British silent feature films
Films shot in Greater Manchester
British black-and-white films
1920s English-language films
1920s British films
Silent drama films